The International Society for Environmental Epidemiology (ISEE) is a scientific society with membership drawn from more than 60 countries, dedicated to the study of environmental epidemiology and exposure assessment. It provides a forum for the discussion of problems unique to the study of health and the environment. The primary objective of ISEE is to promote research and disseminate scientific findings focused on the relationships between environmental exposures (e.g., air pollutants, food and water contaminants, metals, etc.) and human health. Each year, ISEE puts a spotlight on global discussion of environmental health and gathers scientists from all over the world to discuss measuring harmful factors in the environment including environmental health after disasters, e-waste, endocrine disrupting chemicals affecting pregnancy, and more. These include annual meetings, newsletters, workshops and liaisons with academic, governmental, inter-governmental, non-profit and business institutions.

ISEE was founded in 1987 and held its first formal scientific meeting in 1989. ISEE supports the dissemination of scientific results and international collaborations by hosting annual conferences in all regions of the world, and as of January 2019 the society had six regional chapters. The official scientific journals of the society are Epidemiology and Environmental Epidemiology. The society’s vision is “To improve human health globally through ethically sound environmental epidemiology research, education, and practice”.

The ISEE supports the involvement of scientists from developing countries and students through targeted programs and reduced dues rates.

ISEE Awards 
The achievements of members are recognized through an awards program. Awards are presented at the annual meeting and acknowledge individuals for their contributions to the field:
 Rebecca James Baker Award
 Tony McMichael Mid-Term Career Award
 John Goldsmith Award
 Research Integrity Award
 Best Environmental Epidemiology Paper Award

Publications 
ISEE publishes newsletters covering environmental health news, ISEE updates, and chapter highlights. The ISEE Ethics and Philosophy Committee releases policy documents and information related to ethical guidelines and leadership. ISEE members also publish invited commentaries related to environmental epidemiology and public health in Epidemiology.

Annual Meeting 
The ISEE Annual Meeting draws thousands of attendees from across the world  and comprises a programme of diverse scientific sessions that cover new research and emerging trends in environmental research, epidemiology, public policy, and exposure assessment.

Committees 
ISEE is composed of nine committees, including an Annual Conference Committee, an Awards Committee, a Capacity Building and Education Committee, a Communications Committee, an Ethics and Philosophy Committee, a Membership Committee, a Nominations Committee, a Policy Committee, and a Student & New Researchers Network.

Regional Chapters 
The society supports regional chapters in Africa, Asia, Eastern Mediterranean, Europe, Latin America and the Caribbean, and North America. Each chapter focuses on local and regional issues that are of particular interest to their members.

References 

Environmental social science
Epidemiology organizations